Teyk or Teyak may refer to:

Teyak, Chaharmahal and Bakhtiari